Dhan Singh Negi is an Indian politician who was a member of the Uttarakhand Legislative Assembly from 2017 to 2022 representing the Tehri constituency in Tehri Garhwal district. Previously affiliated to the Bharatiya Janata Party (BJP), he switched to the Indian National Congress party (INC) in early 2022. In the 2017 state assembly elections, he defeated Dinesh Dhanai, then Cabinet Minister by a large margin.

Early life and education
Dhan Singh Negi was born in 1970 as the youngest child of a poor family in Palkot, a remote village in Patti Lamridhar, Tehri Garhwal, Uttar Pradesh (now Uttarakhand), India. His education includes a Master of Physics at Hemvati Nandan Bahuguna Garhwal University and a Bachelor of Education teaching qualification. He was awarded an honorary degree of Doctor of Philosophy in 2019.

Career
Negi worked as a lecturer in Physics before becoming a full-time politician. He was a member of Badri-Kedar Temple Committee and was chairman of the Aanchal Milk Cooperative Society in Tehri Garhwal from 2009 to 2012. He was elected to the Uttarakhand Legislative Assembly in 2017, receiving 20,896 votes, defeating Dinesh Dhanai, then cabinet minister by a margin of 6,840 votes.
In April 2017 he declared that he would donate half of his salary to support the marriages of daughters of widows, disabled and poor people.

He also presided over the Public Sector Units & Municipal Oversight and the Information Technology Policy committees of the Uttarakhand Assembly. Negi is a member of the board of Doon University and the Uttarakhand State Wildlife Board.

Positions held

Legislative Assembly Elections contested

References

Living people
Bharatiya Janata Party politicians from Uttarakhand
Uttarakhand MLAs 2017–2022
People from New Tehri
1972 births
Garhwali people